James River State Park is a state park located along the James River in Buckingham County, Virginia.  Opened June 20, 1999, it preserves part of the route of the Kanawha Canal in addition to portions of the river.

These fields are maintained by periodic prescribed fire to facilitate growth of the native grasses. Very few areas of this size with warm season grasses still exist in the Eastern United States.

References
Park website

State parks of Virginia
Parks in Buckingham County, Virginia
Protected areas established in 1999
1999 establishments in Virginia
Nature centers in Virginia